The Diocese of Springfield in Illinois is a Latin Church ecclesiastical territory, or diocese, of the Catholic Church in south central Illinois in the United States. The prelate is a bishop serving as pastor of the Cathedral of the Immaculate Conception in Springfield

The Diocese of Springfield in Illinois is a suffragan diocese in the ecclesiastical province of the metropolitan Archdiocese of Chicago. The metropolitan bishop of Springfield in Illinois is the Archbishop of Chicago. On April 20, 2010, Pope Benedict XVI named Thomas J. Paprocki as the ninth bishop of  Springfield in Illinois.

Territory 
The Diocese of Springfield in Illinois comprises the following counties:

Adams, Bond, Brown, Calhoun, Cass, Christian, Clark, Coles, Crawford, Cumberland, Douglas, Edgar, Effingham, Fayette, Greene, Jasper, Jersey, Macon, Macoupin, Madison, Menard, Moultrie, Montgomery, Morgan, Pike, Sangamon, Scott, and Shelby. 

The counties are organized into five deaneries:  Alton, Jerseyville, Mattoon, Quincy and Springfield.

History

Early history 
During the 17th century, present day Illinois was part of the French colony of New France. The Diocese of Quebec, which had jurisdiction over the colony, sent numerous French missionaries to the region. After the British took control of New France in 1763, the Archdiocese of Quebec retained jurisdiction over missions in the Illinois area. In 1776, the new United States claimed sovereignty over the area of Illinois. In 1785, Archbishop John Carroll of the Archdiocese of Baltimore, then having jurisdiction over the entire United States, sent his first missionary to Illinois. In 1787, the area became part of the Northwest Territory of the United States.

With the creation of the Diocese of Bardstown in Kentucky in 1810, supervision of the Illinois missions shifted there. In 1827, the Diocese of St. Louis assumed jurisdiction in the new state of Illinois.  In 1834, the Vatican erected the Diocese of Vincennes, which included both Indiana and Illinois.A group of Springfield Catholics in 1840 petitioned the Vatican to establish an Illinois diocese in their city, but it was denied. Instead, the Vatican created the Diocese of Chicago in 1843, with jurisdiction over all of Illinois.

On July 29, 1853, Pope Pius IX erected the Diocese of Quincy, based in Alton, Illinois.  He appointed    Reverend Joseph Melcher of the Archdiocese of St. Louis to serve as bishop both in Quincy and Chicago.  However, Melcher refused the appointment. The pope did not appoint another bishop for Quincy.

Diocese of Alton 
Four years later in 1857, Pius IX suppressed the Diocese of Quincy and erected the new Diocese of Alton in Alton Illinois.  He appointed Henry Juncker as the first bishop of Alton.  At the time of Juncker's arrival, the diocese contained 58 churches, 30 mission stations, 18 priests, and 50,000 Catholics. Needing more priests, he traveled to Europe in 1857 to recruit them from France, Germany, Ireland and Italy for his diocese.

Juncker completed the first cathedral in the diocese in 1859, and founded two men's colleges, six girls' academies, a seminary, two hospitals, and one orphanage. During one stay in Randolph County, a delegation from Red Bud, Illinois, asked Juncker to visit them.  The townspeople said they had never seen a priest there.  During his visit to Red Bud, Juncker heard confession from 1,000 Catholics and received a donation of land from a Protestant businessman for a new church.

When the American Civil War started in 1861, Juncker asked his parishioners to pray for peace.  When the Union Army opened a medical camp for wounded soldiers in Cairo, Illinois, he sent priests and nuns there to provide support. Juncker died in 1868. By the time of his death, the Diocese of Alton had 125 churches, over 100 priests, and 80,000 Catholics.

Pius IX appointed Peter Baltes of the Diocese of Chicago as the second bishop of Alton in 1869.  Baltes quickly instituted a constitution that outline practices with all the parishes.  Baltes issued a pastoral letter in 1879 that banned Catholics in his diocese from reading newspapers or journals that criticized the Catholic Church. He banned contemporary music from church services, replacing it with the Gregorian chant and Cecilian music. By the end of his tenure, the diocese included 109,000 Catholics, 177 priests, 126 parishes and 77 missions, 13 hospitals, three orphanages, two homes for the elderly, two men's colleges, a boys' high school, nine girls' academies, and 102 parochial schools with 11,000 students.In January 1884, 27 nuns died in a fire at the Convent of the Sisters of Notre Dame in Belleville.  Baltes attended the funeral mass there, but was too sick to celebrate it.

After Baltes died in 1886, Pope Leo XIII appointed James Ryan from the Diocese of Peoria as the third bishop of Alton. During his 35-year-long tenure, Ryan established 40 new churches and six hospitals, and increased the number of Catholics from 70,000 to over 87,000. He held the first diocesan synod in February 1889.

Diocese of Springfield in Illinois 
After James Ryan died in 1923, Pope Pius IX dissolved the Diocese of Alton and erected the Diocese of Springfield in Illinois in its place on October 26, 1923.  He appointed Reverend James Griffin of the Diocese of Chicago as the first bishop of the new diocese.  Griffin dedicated the new Cathedral of the Immaculate Conception in Springfield in 1928. During his tenure as bishop, Griffin erected 51 new churches, schools, convents and charitable institutions; the total cost spent in his first ten years was close to $6.5 million. He established Marquette Catholic High School in Alton and Springfield Junior College in Springfield. Griffin died in 1948.

Pope Pius XII in 1948 appointed William O'Connor from the Archdiocese of Chicago as the second bishop of Springfield.  O'Connor instituted the Confraternity of Christian Doctrine in 1950, initiated the diocesan development fund in 1952 for missionary work within the diocese, and founded the diocesan Latin School in 1954 for training young men preparing to enter the priesthood. He held diocesan synods in 1953 and 1963. After 27 years as bishop, O'Connor died in 1975.

The next bishop of Springfield was Auxiliary Bishop Joseph McNicholas of the Archdiocese of St. Louis, appointed by Pope Paul VI in 1975. He hosted the first Midwest Regional Meeting of the St. Vincent de Paul Society to be held in downstate Illinois, and in 1978 appointed the first nun to the position of superintendent of Catholic schools. He also renamed the diocesan newspaper as Time and Eternity.  After McNicolas' death in 1983, Pope John Paul II named Reverend Daniel L. Ryan of the Diocese of Joliet as his successor.  Ryan resigned in 1999.

In 1999, Pope John Paul II appointed George Joseph Lucas of the Archdiocese of St. Louis as bishop of Springfield. In 2001, Lucas established a diaconate formation program for the diocese. The five-year program prepared men to become deacons was run by the diocesan Office for the Diaconate, in cooperation with Quincy University in Quincy, Illinois. On June 24, 2007, Lucas ordained the first class of eighteen men. In January 2002, Lucas launched an endowment/capital campaign called Harvest of Thanks, Springtime of Hope. The program raised over $22.1 million, used to support Catholic education, Catholic Charities, the formation of seminarians and deacon candidates, and the care of retired priests. Lucas spearheaded the Built in Faith campaign to raise the $11 million needed to restore the Cathedral of the Immaculate Conception. Lucas attended the cathedral dedication on December 2, 2009.

In 2009, Pope Benedict XVI named Lucas as archbishop of the Archdiocese of Omaha and appointed Auxiliary Bishop Thomas Paprocki of the Archdiocese of Chicago as Lucas' replacement. Paprocki is the current bishop of Springfield in Illinois.

Sexual Abuse 
In late October 1999, Matthew McCormick sued the Diocese of Springfield, claiming that Alvin J. Campbell, a diocesan priest, abused him as an altar boy from 1982 to 1985.  McCormick claimed that Bishop Daniel Ryan and the diocese did nothing to protect him, and that Ryan was guilty of numerous sexual affairs with male prostitutes and priests, creating a poisoned atmosphere. A diocese spokesperson said that Ryan removed Campbell in 1985 as soon as he heard about the accusations.  Campbell later spent seven years in prison for child sexual abuse.  Ryan denied having any affairs. The diocese settled with McCormick in 2004.

In a 2002 Joliet Herald-News article, an unidentified priest from the Diocese of Joliet said that Ryan made sexual advances against him when the two men were staying at a hotel while visiting an out of town parish in 1982. In August 2002, the diocese received allegations that Ryan had solicited sex from four boys in 1984.  One of the alleged victims, Frank Sigretto, said that Ryan picked him up off the street and offered him $50 for a massage.  During the massage, Ryan made sexual advances to the 15 year-old boy.  The Diocese of Springfield referred its case to the Sangamon County, Illinois district attorney, but the DA could not prosecute Ryan because the statute of limitations had expired.

Having continued to administer confirmation and celebrate mass, Ryan voluntarily agreed in 2004 to suspend his public ministry. In 2006, an independent investigative report was commissioned by Bishop Lucas.  In its report, the Special Panel on Clergy Misconduct declared that Ryan "engaged in improper sexual conduct and used his office to conceal his activities".  Ryan also fostered "a culture of secrecy...that discouraged faithful priests from coming forward with information about misconduct" by other clergy in the diocese.

In a video interview taped in 2004, Thomas Munoz accused Lucas, when he was a priest, of having sex with several priests and seminarians in a so-called orgy.  Lucas denied all the allegations. The diocese nvestigated the allegations and in 2006 declared them to be totally false.  The same allegations were raised again in 2021 in a lawsuit by Anthony J. Gorgia, a former seminarian, against the Pontifical North American College in Rome and the Archdiocese of New York.

In July 2004, Lucas approved a $1.2 million settlement to eight men who had been sexually abused as minors by Walter Weerts, a diocese priest at Sacred Heart Parish in Villa Grove, Illinois between 1973 and 1980.  Convicted of sexual abuse crimes in 1986, Weerts spent three years in prison and was removed from the priesthood in March 1989.

Statistics 
:

 142,847 Catholics
 130 parishes
 106 diocesan priests (active and retired)
 49 religious priests
 27 religious brothers
 667 women religious
 37 Permanent deacons
 2,344 baptisms
 1,980 first communions
 2,041 confirmations
 667 weddings
 1,610 funerals
 294 scheduled weekend masses
 :

 151,601 Catholics
 132 parishes
 87 active priests; 62 religious institute priests
 122 diocesan priests (including retired and serving outside the diocese)
 6 Catholic hospitals

Bishops

Bishop Elect of Quincy
 Joseph Melcher (Appointed 1853; did not take effect); appointed Bishop of Green Bay

Bishops of Alton
 Henry Damian Juncker (1857-1868)
 Peter Joseph Baltes (1870-1886)
 James Ryan (1888-1923)

Bishops of Springfield in Illinois
 James Aloysius Griffin (1924-1948)
 William Aloysius O'Connor (1949-1975)
 Joseph Alphonse McNicholas (1975-1983)
 Daniel L. Ryan (1984-1999)
 George J. Lucas (1999-2009), appointed Archbishop of Omaha
 Thomas J. Paprocki (2010–present)

Other priests of the diocese who became bishops
 John Janssen, appointed Bishop of Belleville in 1888
 John Baptist Franz, appointed Bishop of Dodge City in 1951 and later Bishop of Peoria in 1959
 Victor Hermann Balke, appointed Bishop of Crookston in 1976
 Kevin Vann,  appointed Coadjutor Bishop and Bishop of Fort Worth in 2005 and later Bishop of Orange in 2012
 Carl A. Kemme, appointed Bishop of Wichita in 2014

Parishes 
There are currently 128 parishes in the Diocese of Springfield in Illinois.  The Diocese also operates campus ministry centers at 6 colleges and universities within its boundaries.

Notable parishes:
St. Paul Catholic Church (Highland, Illinois)

Campus ministry 
In addition to these parishes, the Diocese operates campus ministry centers at the following institutions:
 Blackburn College
 Eastern Illinois University
 Illinois College
 Millikin University
 Southern Illinois University Edwardsville
 University of Illinois Springfield

Catholic schools

High schools
There are seven high schools in the Diocese of Springfield in Illinois.
 Marquette Catholic High School, Alton, Illinois
 St. Teresa High School, Decatur, Illinois
 St. Anthony High School, Effingham, Illinois
 Routt Catholic High School, Jacksonville, Illinois
 Father McGivney Catholic High School, Glen Carbon, Illinois
 Quincy Notre Dame High School, Quincy, Illinois
 Sacred Heart-Griffin High School, Springfield, Illinois
This does not count Ursuline Academy, closed in 2007.

Universities
There is one Catholic university in the Diocese of Springfield in Illinois.
 Quincy University

Religious houses
The Diocese is home to 14 religious houses.

Arms

See also
Christian Hill Historic District

References

External links 

 Roman Catholic Diocese of Springfield in Illinois Official Site

 
Springfield in Illinois
Springfield, Illinois
Springfield in Illinois
Springfield in Illinois
1853 establishments in Illinois